El oficinista is an Argentine novel by Guillermo Saccomanno. It was first published in 2010, and won the 2010 Biblioteca Breve Prize. The jury was composed of: José Manuel Caballero Bonald, Pere Gimferrer, Ricardo Menéndez Salmón, Rosa Montero and Elena Ramirez. Set in the future, it is about an office worker who falls in love with a secretary, and dreams of being different.

References

External links
'El oficinista' de Guillermo Saccomanno
EL OFICINISTA, de SACCOMANNO, Guillermo

Spanish-language novels
2010 Argentine novels